"Ghetto Romance" is a song by British R&B group Damage, released in June 2000 as the first single from their second album, Since You've Been Gone (2001). The song was produced by Tim & Bob, and peaked at number seven on the UK Singles Chart.

Charts

References

2000 songs
2000 singles
Damage (British band) songs
Cooltempo Records singles
Song recordings produced by Tim & Bob
Songs written by Bob Robinson (songwriter)
Songs written by Tim Kelley